Simuliinae is a subfamily of black flies (Simuliidae). It contains over 2,200 species, with over 1,800 of them in the genus Simulium. There are 2 tribes and 25 living genera. A further 5 genera are known only from Cretaceous fossils.

Literature cited

Simuliidae
Insect vectors of human pathogens
Taxa named by Edward Newman
Nematocera subfamilies